Zedler is a German surname. Notable people with the surname include:

Johann Heinrich Zedler (1706–1751), publisher of a German encyclopedia
Gottfried Zedler (1860–1945), German historian and librarian
Bill Zedler (born 1943), Republican member of the Texas House of Representatives
Joy Zedler (born 1943), American ecologist
Harry Zedler (born 1946), German footballer

See also
Zeidler

German-language surnames